Vladimir Nikitovich Maslachenko (5 March 1936 – 28 November 2010) was a Soviet footballer and football commentator.  He was born in Vasylkivka, Dnipropetrovsk Oblast, in the Ukrainian SSR.

Biography
Maslachenko was a native Ukrainian (khokhol as he called himself) from Vasylkivka (a settlement in west Donbas) and a product of youth football club from Kryvyi Rih. His senior level career he started in 1953 when he joined the local football "giant" FC Dnipro which at the time was known as Metallurg Dnepropetrovsk.

After several seasons in 1957 Maslachenko was invited to Moscow where he stayed to his death. In Moscow he competed for Lokomotiv and Spartak. During that period he also played for the Soviet Union national football team and became a European champion in 1960. In 1962 Maslachenko became a champion of the Soviet Class A First Group (Soviet top league) with Spartak Moscow.

After retiring in 1970 Maslachenko graduated the State Central Institute of Physical Culture. The same year he started his other career as a pundit (radio commentator) at the All Union Radio and the Central Television. In 1972-73 Maslachenko tried himself out as a football manager, while coaching in Chad.

In 1973-1990 he worked as a sports commentator in Soviet television news program Vremya at the First Programme of the Central Television. Following dissolution of the Soviet Union he worked as at the Russian State Television and Radio Company "Ostankino" and since 1996 at the Russian NTV.

In 2010 he died in Moscow.

Honours
 Soviet Top League winner: 1962.
 Soviet Cup winner: 1957, 1963, 1965.
 Soviet Goalkeeper of the Year: 1961.

International career
He earned 8 caps for the USSR national football team, and participated in two World Cups, as well as the first ever European Nations' Cup in 1960, where the Soviets were champions.

References

External links
Profile (in Russian)

1936 births
2010 deaths
Soviet footballers
Soviet Union international footballers
1958 FIFA World Cup players
1962 FIFA World Cup players
1960 European Nations' Cup players
UEFA European Championship-winning players
FC Dnipro players
FC Lokomotiv Moscow players
FC Spartak Moscow players
Soviet Top League players
Russian association football commentators
Ukrainian footballers
Association football goalkeepers
Soviet sports journalists
Sportspeople from Dnipropetrovsk Oblast